The 2006–07 A1 Grand Prix of Nations, Indonesia was an A1 Grand Prix race held on December 10, 2006 at Sentul International Circuit, Indonesia. This was the fifth race in the 2006-07 A1 Grand Prix season and the second meeting held at the circuit.

Results

Qualification

Sprint Race Results
The Sprint Race took place on Sunday, December 10, 2006

Feature Race Results
The Feature race took place on Sunday, December 10, 2006

Total Points

 Fastest Lap:

References

Indonesia
A1 Grand Prix
Auto races in Indonesia